Helena Malikova (born 1983) is a Slovakian civil servant and an academic. She is a Slovak national.

Malikova has been overseeing at the European Commission the investigation in the EU Apple State aid case against Ireland. In 2016, the case resulted in a claim of 13 billion euro of unpaid taxes owed by Apple to the Republic of Ireland.

Academic work
Malikova is a fellow at the Hertie School working on questions of artificial intelligence (AI), in particular the question of global leadership in AI, and on competition policy.

She was a fellow at UC Berkeley in California over the academic year 2016/17. Malikova is an alumna of the College of Europe.

European Union
Malikova joined the European civil service in 2009. Her prior job was with the bank Credit Suisse.

At the European Commission, Malikova is working on antitrust matters and on the issue of increasing corporate market power. 
She has been involved in a number of investigations by the European Commission into tax arrangements by multinational corporations, including Apple, Amazon, Starbucks, Fiat and Engie.

She is a frequent commentator on questions of diversity and gender equality at the EU institutions.

References

Living people
College of Europe alumni
European women
Scholars of competition law
Slovak women
Slovak women academics
Women government officials
Women civil servants
1983 births